Banjarnegara is a regency in the southwestern part of Central Java province in Indonesia. The regency covers an area of 1,069.73 km2, and it had a population of 868,913 at the 2010 Census and 1,017,767 at the 2020 Census; the official estimate as at mid 2021 was 1,026,866. Its capital is the town of Banjarnegara.

Administrative Districts
Banjarnegara Regency comprises twenty districts (kecamatan), tabulated below with their areas and their populations at the 2010 Census and the 2020 Census, together with the official estimates as at mid 2021. The table also includes the location of the district administrative centres, the number of administrative villages in each district (totalling 266 rural desa and 12 urban kelurahan) and its postal code.

Of the 278 villages, 266 are classified as rural desa and 12 as urban kelurahan (9 in Banjarnegara town, 2 in Madukara District and 1 in Sigaluh District).

Transport 
There is a bus terminal called Mandiraja Terminal in this regency.

References